"Memorare" is a science fiction novella  by American writer Gene Wolfe, published in 2007.  It was nominated for the 2008 Nebula Award for Best Novella.

Plot summary
The story follows March Wildspring, a film maker who has traveled to the asteroid belt and is filming inside the memorials left behind as tombstones for departed space travelers. It is dangerous work because several of them contain traps intended to kill unsuspecting visitors and force their souls into eternal bondage. To help him with the voice over commentary March’s girlfriend, Kit, goes to the asteroid belt with a battered woman who is trying to escape her abusive husband. Together, the three of them decide to enter the most dangerous memorial of all.

References

2007 short stories
Science fiction short stories
American novellas
Short stories by Gene Wolfe
Works originally published in The Magazine of Fantasy & Science Fiction